Jarovići may refer to:

 Jarovići (Goražde), a village in Bosnia and Herzegovina
 Jarovići (Rogatica), a village in Bosnia and Herzegovina